Vincent Kiplangat Kosgei is a Kenyan hurdler. At the 2012 Summer Olympics, he competed in the Men's 400 metres hurdles.

References

Kenyan male hurdlers
Living people
Olympic athletes of Kenya
Athletes (track and field) at the 2012 Summer Olympics
Athletes (track and field) at the 2010 Commonwealth Games
Commonwealth Games medallists in athletics
1985 births
Commonwealth Games silver medallists for Kenya
Medallists at the 2010 Commonwealth Games